Talanayar block is a revenue block in Nagapattinam district, Tamil Nadu, India. There are a total of 27 panchayat villages in this block.

References 
 

Revenue blocks of Nagapattinam district